Barthold Hansteen Cranner (6 March 1867 – 2 February 1925) was a Norwegian botanist.

Born in Oslo, he worked as a professor at the Norwegian College of Agriculture. He especially worked with phosphoric, lipidic matter in plant cells.

References

1867 births
1925 deaths
19th-century Norwegian botanists
Academic staff of the Norwegian College of Agriculture
20th-century Norwegian botanists